King of the Witches may refer to:

Simon, King of the Witches 
Witch-king of Angmar
Zhengyi
King of Galicia